Abel Douglass (1841–1908) was an American whaling captain.

Douglass born in 1841 in Maine as part of a seafaring maritime family.

Career
In the 1860s, Douglass partnered with James Dawson. The Dawson and Douglass Whaling Company worked off the coast of British Columbia. The non-Native whaling industry in British Columbia began when Dawson and Douglass took eight whales from Saanich Inlet in 1868.

Dawson and Douglass founded Whaletown in 1869 as a whaling station on Cortes Island. The Whaletown operation was later moved to what is now called Whaling Station Bay on Hornby Island; the Dawson and Douglass Company merged with the Lipsett Whaling Company to form the British Columbia Whaling Company, but the company closed in 1871.

Personal life
Douglass had a common-law relationship with Maria Mahoi, who was of Hawaiian and First Nations descent; they lived with their seven children on Saltspring Island. Mahoi later married George Fisher and moved to Russell Island.

See also
A Tale for the Time Being a novel by Ruth Ozeki, mentions Douglass
History of whaling

References

External links

1841 births
1908 deaths
History of British Columbia
Sea captains
People from Maine
American people in whaling